Darren O'Connell (born 1997) is an Irish hurler who plays for Limerick Senior Championship club Kildimo/Pallaskenry and at inter-county level with the Limerick senior hurling team. He usually lines out as a right corner-forward.

Career statistics

Honours

Garryspillane
Limerick Premier Intermediate Hurling Championship (1): 2020

Limerick
All-Ireland Senior Hurling Championship (1): 2020
Munster Senior Hurling Championship (1): 2020
National Hurling League (1): 2020
Munster Senior Hurling League (2): 2020

References

1997 births
Living people
Kildimo-Pallaskenry hurlers
Limerick inter-county hurlers